Diocese of Raphoe can refer to:

 The Roman Catholic Diocese of Raphoe
 The Church of Ireland (Anglican) Diocese of Derry and Raphoe